The Women's Uruguayan Championship is the highest division of women's football in Uruguay, and is organized by the Uruguayan Football Association since 1997, from a FIFA request.

Format
The current format, first played in 2014, is divided into two stages. The first stage in played in three to four team groups. The best teams then advance to the championship round, called Copa de Oro, while the last placed teams play for the Copa de Plata. Both rounds in the second stage are played with about 7 teams. The winner of the Copa de Oro is the national champion and qualifies to the Copa Libertadores Femenina. The losers of the Copa de Plata are relegated to the Campeonato Uruguayo Femenino B.

Since 2017 the Apertura and Clausura format is played. In 2017 there were two stages. In the first stage there were seven teams that played each other once. The leading team qualified for stage 2, the teams placed second to sixth played a playoff round with the three winners advancing to stage 2 as well. The final four teams had their points reset and then played a round-robin (the cuadrangular) for the title.

Since 2018 the Apertura and Clausura are both standard round-robin.

Champions 
The Uruguayan championship organized by the Uruguayan Football Association began to dispute in 1997. Before that, championships were unofficial.

Titles by club

See also 
 Uruguay women's national football team
 Copa Libertadores de Fútbol Femenino
 Uruguayan football league system

References

External links 
 AUF
 League at soccerway.com
 Women's Uruguayan Championship in RSSSF

Women
Uruguay
Sports leagues established in 1997
1997 establishments in Uruguay
Women's football in Uruguay
Women's sports leagues in Uruguay